Wibke Kristin Timmermann is a German scholar of international law. She was awarded the Henry Dunant Prize 2006 for her thesis "Incitement, Instigation, Hate Speech and War Propaganda in International Law".

Works

References

 

International criminal law scholars
Living people
Year of birth missing (living people)
Place of birth missing (living people)